Tapejara may refer to:
Tapejara wellnhoferi, a species of pterosaur 
Tapejara, Rio Grande do Sul
Tapejara, Paraná